Erdoğan Partener (5 March 1929 – 13 November 1995) was a Turkish basketball player. He competed in the men's tournament at the 1952 Summer Olympics.

References

1929 births
1995 deaths
Turkish men's basketball players
Olympic basketball players of Turkey
Basketball players at the 1952 Summer Olympics
Sportspeople from Bonn
20th-century Turkish people